The Apostolic History Network is an interdenominational and independent organization researching Apostolic church history. Apostolic History Network is a registered charity under the name of Netzwerk Apostolische Geschichte e.V. at the court of Bielefeld, Germany.

Literature
Proceedings, directly from the network Apostolic History
 Die apostolischen Gemeinden im Umbruch - 1863 bis 1900. Nürtingen 2008, 
 Aufbau, Ausbau, Trennungen. Die Entwicklung der apostolischen Gemeinschaften im ersten Drittel des 20. Jahrhunderts. Nürtingen 2009, 
 Kirche auf dem Weg - die apostolischen Gemeinschaften im Verlauf des 20. Jahrhunderts. Bielefeld 2010, 
 Frankfurt im Spiegel der Geschichte der Apostolischen Gemeinschaften. Steinhagen 2013, 
The selection of literature or works of members of the network Apostolic History
 Wissen, Volker: Zur Freiheit berufen - Ein Porträt der Vereinigung Apostolischer Gemeinden und ihrer Gliedkirchen, Remscheid 2008, 
 Diersmann, Edwin: An ihren Früchten sollt ihr sie erkennen - Das Erbe von F.W. Schwarz, ReDi-Roma Verlag, 10.2007, 
 Eberle, Mathias: Die Liturgie. - Andachtsbuch zum Gebrauch bei allen Gottesdiensten der christlichen Kirche.  Hamburg, 1864. Kommentierte Neuausgabe mit den Änderungen der zweiten Auflage von 1894., Nürtingen 2008, Edition Punctum Saliens Verlag
 Wissen, Volker: Theologische Entwicklungen der Vereinigung Apostolischer Gemeinden (VAG) von 1956 bis heute., Remscheid 2009, 
 Diersmann, Edwin: Die Kirchenspaltung in der HAZEA Edition Punctum Saliens Verlag, Bielefeld 2011, 
 Fadire, Peter: Das Werk des Herrn ReDi-Roma Verlag, 2011,

References

External links 
apostolische-geschichte.de - Official site of Netzwerk Apostolische Geschichte
APWiki.de - Encyclopedia of the apostolic faith communities under the leadership of the Apostolic History Network
archiv-brockhagen.de - Official Site of the archive Brockhagen
apostolische-dokumente.de - online archive of freely downloadable books

Irvingism
Organizations established in 2010